McKinley Hill Stadium is a 2,000-seater football stadium at McKinley Hill in Taguig, Metro Manila, Philippines.

History
McKinley Hill Stadium was erected by real estate developer Megaworld Corporation and constructed by All Asia Structures, Inc.. The contract to develop the stadium intended for business process outsourcing (BPO) company teams and high school and collegiate teams, was signed in January 2012.

The stadium was inaugurated on February 7, 2013 with the hosting of the United Football League (UFL) Division One match between Manila Nomads and Philippine Air Force.

The stadium would be known as the Emperador Stadium, after its sponsor Emperador Distillers Incorporated, a liquor making company and a sister company of Megaworld until around mid-2015.

Facilities
McKinley Hill Stadium sits on a  land in McKinley Hill, Fort Bonifacio, Taguig. The stadium has an artificial pitch and a seating capacity of 2,000.

Tenants

The McKinley Hill Stadium has been a venue of the now defunct United Football League (UFL). The UFL signed a deal with Megaworld in April 2012, prior to the completion of the stadium, which gave the league priority on the field usage of the venue for the next four years.

The Philippine Rugby Football Union signed a memorandum of agreement in 2015 with Megaworld stating that the venue will be used as the official training ground of the national rugby teams.

The venue has also hosted matches of the 7's Football League.

References

Sports venues in Metro Manila
Football venues in the Philippines
Bonifacio Global City
American football venues in the Philippines
2013 establishments in the Philippines
Sports venues completed in 2013